No. 651 Squadron Army Air Corps, is an aircraft squadron of the British Army, originally formed as No. 651 Squadron Royal Air Force in Italy and North Africa during the Second World War, and afterwards in Egypt. Numbers 651 to 663 Squadrons of the RAF were Air Observation Post units which had both Army and RAF personnel. The pilots, drivers and signallers were in the Royal Artillery whilst the adjutants, technical staff and equipment officers came from the RAF. Air observation posts were used primarily for artillery spotting, but occasionally for liaison and other duties. Their duties and squadron numbers were transferred to the Army with the formation of the Army Air Corps on 1 September 1957.

History

No 651 Squadron was formed at RAF Old Sarum, Wiltshire, on 1 August 1941. It went into action in November of 1942, during Operation Torch in North Africa. It later served in North Africa, Italy and finally Egypt from 1945 where it remained until 1 November 1955. On that same day, No. 657 Squadron RAF was re-numbered to 651 Squadron at RAF Middle Wallop, it now flew Sycamore helicopters as well as Austers.

No. 1908 Independent Air Observation Post Flight was formed within 651 Squadron previously 'A' Flight along with No. 1909 Air Observation Post Flight which was formed within 651 Squadron previously 'B' Flight.

On 1 September 1957, the squadron was transferred to the Army Air Corps and became No. 651 Squadron AAC. 

On 1 April 2019, 651 Squadron and its aircraft, the Britten-Norman Defender and Britten-Norman BN-2 Islander, were transferred to the Royal Air Force as part of ISTAR Force in No. 1 Group based at RAF Waddington. 651 Squadron continued to operate the aircraft until they were retired from service on 30 June 2021. On 1 August 2021, 651 Squadron transferred back to the Army as part of 1 Regiment AAC.

Aircraft operated

See also
 List of Army Air Corps aircraft units
 List of Royal Air Force aircraft squadrons

References

Notes

Bibliography

Further reading

External links

Army Air Corps aircraft squadrons
Military units and formations established in 1957